Droylsden was a parliamentary constituency in the historic county of Lancashire in the North West of England.  It returned one Member of Parliament (MP) to the House of Commons of the Parliament of the United Kingdom, elected by the first past the post system.

History
The constituency was created for the 1950 general election, and abolished for the 1955 general election. Before 1950 the area had formed part of the Mossley constituency.

The former MP for Mossley, the Rev. G.S. Woods, was elected as a Labour Co-operative member in the first election for this constituency in 1950. He sat in Parliament until he died, shortly before the 1951 election. A new Labour MP, W.R. Williams, was elected in 1951 and represented the seat for the rest of its existence.

Boundaries
The constituency was formed by combining four Urban Districts, situated to the north east of Manchester. They were Audenshaw, Denton, Droylsden, and Failsworth.

In 1955 the constituency was abolished. Audenshaw and Denton became part of Manchester Gorton constituency. Failsworth was attached to the division of Manchester Openshaw. Droylsden became part of the Ashton-under-Lyne constituency, which in the 1955 redistribution extended west to the borders of Manchester.

Members of Parliament

Note:-
 a Seat vacant at dissolution, following the death of Woods on 9 July 1951.

Elections

 Seat vacant on dissolution - death

 Swing from Labour to Conservative
 Constituency abolished (1955)

References
 Boundaries of Parliamentary Constituencies 1885-1972, compiled and edited by F.W.S. Craig (Parliamentary Reference Publications 1972)
 British Parliamentary Election Results 1950-1973, compiled and edited by F.W.S. Craig (Parliamentary Research Services 1983)
 Who's Who of British Members of Parliament, Volume IV 1945-1979'', edited by M. Stenton and S. Lees (Harvester Press 1981)

Parliamentary constituencies in North West England (historic)
Constituencies of the Parliament of the United Kingdom established in 1950
Constituencies of the Parliament of the United Kingdom disestablished in 1955
Politics of Tameside
Droylsden